Wyoming Highway 210 (WYO 210), also known as Happy Jack Road, is a  state highway in Laramie and Albany counties in Wyoming, United States, that runs from Cheyenne to Interstate 80/U.S. Route 30 (I-80/US 30),  east of Laramie.

Route description 
WYO 210 begins at Exit 10 on Interstate 25/U.S. Route 87 (I-25/US 87) in Cheyenne. The Laramie-Albany County Line is at milepost 25.82, and the boundary for Medicine Bow National Forest is at milepost 26.45.
WYO 210 passes through Vedauwoo, an area of rocky outcrops located in south-eastern Wyoming. At Curt Gowdy State Park, there are two visible reservoirs that supply water to Cheyenne. Both reside on the south side of Happy Jack Road, Crystal reservoir is the farthest east while Granite it farthest west and visible from the highway.

Major intersections

See also

 List of state highways in Wyoming

References

External links

 Cheyenne @ AARoads.com
 Wyoming State Routes 200-299
 Wyoming Highway 210
 WYO 210 - I-25/US 87 to WYO 222
 WYO 210 - WYO 222 to I-80/US 30

210
Transportation in Albany County, Wyoming
Transportation in Laramie County, Wyoming
210